Astrid Crabo (born 10 July 1971) is a Swedish retired badminton player affiliated with Täby BMF. She won a bronze medal at the 1995 IBF World Championships in the mixed doubles with Jan-Eric Antonsson, with whom she won the 1993 and 1996 Dutch Open tournaments. They competed in badminton at the 1996 Summer Olympics, but lost in round 16 to Tri Kusharjanto and Minarti Timur from Indonesia. Crabo was named 1989 Swedish Junior player of the year.

References

External links 
 
 

1971 births
Living people
People from Täby Municipality
Swedish female badminton players
Badminton players at the 1996 Summer Olympics
Olympic badminton players of Sweden
Sportspeople from Stockholm County
20th-century Swedish women